Wolfgang Müller may refer to:

  (1922–1960), German actor and comedian (The Spessart Inn)
 Wolfgang Müller (actor) (born 1953), German television actor
 Wolfgang Müller (sprinter) (born 1943), German Olympic sprinter
 Wolfgang Müller (artist) (born 1957), German artist, musician and writer
 Wolfgang Müller (equestrian) (born 1931), German Olympic equestrian
 Wolfgang Müller (field hockey) (born 1938), German Olympic hockey player
 Wolfgang Müller (skier) (born 1955), German Olympic skier
 Wolfgang Müller (weightlifter) (born 1936), German Olympic weightlifter
 Wolfgang Philipp Müller, founder of VDM Publishing

See also
Wolfgang Müller von Königswinter (1816–1873), German novelist and poet